Mayna is the name of several urban localities in Russia:
Mayna, Republic of Khakassia, a work settlement under the administrative jurisdiction of the town of Sayanogorsk, Republic of Khakassia
Mayna, Ulyanovsk Oblast, a work settlement in Maynsky District of Ulyanovsk Oblast

See also
Chuvashskaya Mayna, a rural locality (a selo) in Alexeyevsky District of the Republic of Tatarstan
Nizhnyaya Tatarskaya Mayna, a rural locality (a village) in Aksubayevsky District of the Republic of Tatarstan
Novaya Mayna, an urban locality (a work settlement) in Melekessky District of Ulyanovsk Oblast
Staraya Mayna, an urban locality (a work settlement) in Staromaynsky District of Ulyanovsk Oblast